Events from the year 1631 in Ireland.

Incumbent
Monarch: Charles I

Events
March 28 – the Morres Baronetcy, of Knockagh in the County of Tipperary, is created in the Baronetage of Ireland in favour of John Morres. 
June 20 – Sack of Baltimore: the town of Baltimore, County Cork, is sacked by Algerian pirates.
December 22 – the titles of Viscount Clanmalier and Baron Phillipstown are created in the Peerage of Ireland in favour of Terence O'Dempsey.

Births
William Handcock, politician (d. 1707)

Deaths
April 18 – Henry Docwra, 1st Baron Docwra of Culmore, soldier, statesman and "the founder of Derry" (b. 1564)
November 7 – Patrick Fleming, Franciscan scholar (b. 1599)

References 

 
1630s in Ireland
Ireland
Years of the 17th century in Ireland